Rajmond Toricska (born 11 May 1993 in Cegléd) is a Hungarian professional footballer who plays for Újpest FC.

Club statistics

Updated to games played as of 12 April 2014.

References
MLSZ 

1993 births
Living people
People from Cegléd
Hungarian footballers
Association football midfielders
Újpest FC players
Kozármisleny SE footballers
Nemzeti Bajnokság I players
Sportspeople from Pest County